Debbie Evans (born February 5, 1958) is an American former motorcycle observed trials competitor and current stunt actor. In the 1970s, Evans was considered the best female observed trials rider in the United States, earning factory-backed sponsorship from Yamaha.

Motorcycling career
Evans was born and raised in Lakewood, California and learned to ride a motorcycle at the age of six. Her father, David Evans competed in motorcycle observed trials and she grew up attending motorcycle competitions and learned her trials skills from her father. She began competing in trials and enduro events, usually as the only female in the competition.

In 1978 at the age of 19, she accepted an invitation to compete in the grueling Scottish Six Days Trial, at the suggestion of Bill Emmison of UK importation firm BERM Specialties and with support from Gordon Farley Motorcycles England. Although some enthusiasts thought that the trial may be too difficult for Evans, she proved her skill by not only finishing the event, but finishing in a respectable fourth place against male competitors in the 175cc division.

Evans also began performing exhibition shows, eventually displaying her riding skills in front of tens of thousands of fans at AMA Grand National Championship and AMA Supercross events. She became known for a trick in which she would balance her motorcycle with the kickstand up and perform a headstand on the seat. She appeared in the 1980 motorcycle documentary film, Take It To The Limit, performing her trademark headstand on a motorcycle.

Film industry career
Evans' exceptional riding ability eventually led her to work in the American film industry as a stunt rider. She became so successful as a stunt performer that it became her full-time job. Evans has appeared in over 200 movies and television shows, including motorcycle stunt work in The Matrix Reloaded as well as in The Fast and the Furious film franchise.

Later life
At the age of 40, Evans returned to the sport of observed trials in 1998 to compete in the Women's Trials World Championship. Despite having spent 18 years away from the sport, she finished the season in a respectable 8th place.
Evans was inducted to the AMA Motorcycle Hall of Fame in 2003.

National Trials Championship Career

International Trials Championship Career

References

1958 births
Living people
People from Lakewood, California
American sportswomen
American motorcycle racers
American stunt performers
Motorcycle stunt performers
Stunt drivers
Women stunt performers
Motorcycle trials riders
Enduro riders
Female motorcycle racers
21st-century American women